The following is a non-comprehensive list of Iranian scientists, engineers, and scholars who lived from antiquity up until the beginning of the modern age. For the modern era, see List of contemporary Iranian scientists, scholars, and engineers. For mathematicians of any era, see List of Iranian mathematicians. (A person may appear on two lists, e.g. Abū Ja'far al-Khāzin.)

A
 Abdul Qadir Gilani (12th century) theologian and philosopher 
 Abu al-Qasim Muqane'i (10th century) physician
 Abu Dawood (c. 817–889), Islamic scholar
 Abu Hanifa (699–767), Islamic scholar
 Abu Said Gorgani (10th century) 
 'Adud al-Dawla (936–983), scientific patron
 Ahmad ibn Farrokh (12th century), physician
 Ahmad ibn 'Imad al-Din (11th century), physician and chemist
 Alavi Shirazi (1670–1747), royal physician to Mughal Empire of South Asia
 Amuli, Muhammad ibn Mahmud (c. 1300–1352), physician
 Abū Ja'far al-Khāzin (900–971), mathematician and astronomer 
 Ansari, Khwaja Abdullah (1006–1088), Islamic scholar
 Aqa-Kermani (18th century), physician
 Aqsara'i (?–1379), physician
 Abu Hafsa Yazid, physician
 Arzani, Muqim (18th century), physician
 Astarabadi (15th century), physician
 Aufi, Muhammad (1171–1242), scientist and historian
 Albubather, physician and astrologer 
 Ibn Abi al-Ashʿath, physician
 Abu al-Hassan al-Amiri, theologian and philosopher
 Abu al-Hasan al-Ahwazi, mathematician and astronomer

B
 Brethren of Purity
 Bahmanyār, philosopher
 Al-Baghawi (c. 1041–1122), Islamic scholar
 Bahāʾ al-dīn al-ʿĀmilī (1547–1621), poet, philosopher, architect, mathematician, astronomer
 Baha Al-Dowleh Razi (died c. 915), physician
 Al-Baladhuri (?–892), historian
 Abu Ma'shar al-Balkhi (787–886), known in Latin as Albumasar, astrologer 
 Abu Zayd al-Balkhi (850–934), geographer and mathematician 
 Banū Mūsā brothers (9th century)
 Abu'l-Fadl Bayhaqi, historian
 Abu'l-Hasan Bayhaqi, historian and Islamic scholar
 Al-Bayhaqi, faqih and muhadith
 Muhammad Baqir Behbahani (1706–1791), theologian
 Bubares (died after 480 BC), engineer
 Ibn Bibi (13th century), historian of the Seljuks of Rum
 Biruni (973–1048), astronomer and mathematician 
 Muhammad al-Bukhari (810–870), Islamic scholar
 Sahl ibn Bishr (c. 786–845 ?), astrologer, mathematician
 Bukhtishu (8th century?), Persian Christian physician of Academy of Gundishapur
 Bukhtishu, Abdollah ibn (c. 940–1058), Christian physician in Persia
 Jabril ibn Bukhtishu (9th century), Christian physician
 Bukhtishu, Yuhanna (9th century), Christian physician
 Borzuya (6th century), a.k.a. Borzouyeh-i Tabib, physician of Academy of Gundishapur
 Birjandi (?–1528), astronomer and mathematician 
 Muhammad Bal'ami, historian
 Abu Bakr Rabee Ibn Ahmad Al-Akhawyni Bokhari, physician 
 Abu'l-Fadl al-Bal'ami

C 
 Cabir Bin Hayyan, science; alchemist, chemist and pharmacist; physicist, astronomer and astrologer; medical and physical therapist; engineer, geographer, philosopher and Sufi.
 Cuveyni, historian

D
 Abu Hanifa Dinawari (815–896), polymath 
 Ibn Durustawayh (872–958), grammarian, lexicographer and student of the Quran and hadith
 Ibn Qutaybah (828–885), historian

E
 Abubakr Esfarayeni (13th century?), physician

F
 Al-Farghani (d. 880), astronomer, known in Latin as Alfraganus 
 Al-Farabi (872–950) (Al-Farabi, Pharabius), philosopher 
 Fazari, Ibrahim (?–777), mathematician and astronomer
 Fazari, Mohammad (?–796), mathematician and astronomer
 Feyz Kashani, Mohsen (?–1680), theologian
 Firishta (1560–1620), historian
 Ibn al-Faqih, historian and geographer
 Muhammad ibn Abi Bakr al‐Farisi (d. 1278/1279), astronomer
 Fazlallah Khunji Isfahani (1455–1521), religious scholar, historian and political writer

G
 Gardizi (?–1061), geographer and historian
 Ghazali (Algazel, 1058–1111), philosopher
 Gilani, Hakim (?–1609), royal physician
 Kushyar Gilani (971–1029), mathematician, geographer, astronomer
 Zayn al-Din Gorgani (1041–1136), royal physician
 Rostam Gorgani (16th century), physician
 Al-Masihi (?–999), Avicenn'a master

H
 Hakim Ghulam Imam, physician
 Hakim Muhammad Mehdi Naqi (18th century), physician
 Hakim Muhammad Sharif Khan (18th century), physician
 Hakim Nishaburi (933–1012), Islamic scholar
 Hallaj (858–922), mystic-philosopher
 Hamadani, Mir Sayyid Ali (1314–1384), poet and philosopher
 Harawi, Abolfadl (10th century), astronomer of Buyid dynasty
 Harawi, Muwaffak (10th century), pharmacologist
 Harawi, Muhammad ibn Yusuf (d. 1542), physician
 Hasani, Qavameddin (17th century), physician
 Ibn Hindu (1019–1032), man of letters, physician
 Haji Bektash Veli, mystic
 Ayn al-Quzat Hamadani, jurisconsult, mystic, philosopher, poet and mathematician
 Haseb Tabari, astronomer
 Hammam ibn Munabbih, Islamic scholar
 Hamza al-Isfahani (ca. 893–after 961), philologist and historian
 Abu Ja'far ibn Habash

I
 Ibn Abi Sadiq (11th century), "The Second Hippocrates", Avicenna's disciple
 Ibn Khordadbeh (c. 820–912), geographer
 Ibn Rustah (9th century), explorer and geographer
 Ilaqi, Yusef (11th century), Avicenna's pupil
 Mansur ibn Ilyas (14th century), physician
 Ibn Sina (Avicenna, 980–1037), philosopher and physician
 Isfahani, Jalaleddin (19th century), physician
 Isfahani, Husayn (15th century), physician
 Istakhri (?–957), geographer, gives the earliest known account of windmills
 Iranshahri (9th century), philosopher, teacher of Abu Bakr al-Razi
 Al-Isfizari (11th–12th century), mathematician and astronomer

J
 Jaghmini (14th century), physician

 Juwayni (1028–1085), philosopher, theologian
 Juzjani, Abu Ubaid (?–1070), physician
 Jamal ad-Din Bukhari, astronomer
 Jamasp, philosopher
Jamasp, sage and philosopher
 Al-Abbās ibn Said al-Jawharī (800–860), geometer

K
 Karaji (953–1029), mathematician
 Jamshid-i Kashani (c. 1380–1429), astronomer and mathematician
 Kashfi, Jafar (1775/6–1850/1), theologian
 Sadid al-Din al-Kazaruni (14th century), physician
 Kermani, Iwad (15th century), physician
 Kermani, Shams-ud-Din, Islamic scholar
 Al-Khazini (c. 1130), physicist
 Khayyam, Omar (1048–1131), poet, mathematician, and astronomer
 Khorasani, Sultan Ali (16th century), physician
 Al-Kharaqī, astronomer and mathematician
 Khujandi (c. 940–c. 1000), mathematician and astronomer
 Muhammad ibn Musa al-Khwarizmi (a.k.a. Al-Khwarazmi, c. 780–c. 850), creator of algorithm and algebra, mathematician and astronomer
 Najm al-Dīn al-Qazwīnī al-Kātibī, logician and philosopher
 Shams al-Din al-Khafri, astrologer
 Abū Sahl al-Qūhī, mathematician and astronomer
 Kubra, Najmeddin (1145–1220)
 Abu Ishaq al-Kubunani (d. after 1481), mathematician, astronomer
 Abu Zayn Kahhal, physician

M
 Mahani (9th century), mathematician and astronomer
 Majusi, Ibn Abbas (?–c. 890), physician
 Marvazi, Abu Taher (12th century), philosopher
 Habash al-Hasib al-Marwazi, mathematician, astronomer, geographer
 Masawaiyh (777–857), or Masuya
 Mashallah ibn Athari (740–815), of Jewish origins, from Khorasan who designed the city of Baghdad based on Firouzabad
 Miskawayh (932–1030), philosopher
 Sharaf al-Zaman al-Marwazi, physician
 Hamdallah Mustawfi (1281–1349), geographer
 Mulla Sadra (1572–1640), philosopher
 Ibn al-Muqaffa' (?–756), founder of Arabic prose along with Abdol-Hamid
 bin Musa, Hasan (9th century), astronomer, mathematician
 bin Musa, Ahmad (9th century), astronomer, inventor
 bin Musa, Muhammad (9th century), astronomer, mathematician
 Muhammad ibn Muhammad Tabrizi (13th century), philosopher
 Abu Mansur al-Maturidi, Islamic scholar
 Muqatil ibn Sulayman, mufassir of Quran
 Ibn Manda, Hadith scholar
 Abu Ahmad Monajjem (241/855-56–in 13 Rabi' I 300/29 October 912), music theorist, literary historian
 Masarjawaih (7th century), physician
 Muhammad Abdolrahman, physician

N
 Nagawri (14th century), physician
 Nahavandi, Benjamin, Jewish scholar
 Nahavandi, Ahmad (9th century), astronomer
 Nakhshabi (14th century), physician
 Nasir Khusraw (1004–1088), scientist, Ismaili scholar, mathematician, philosopher, traveler and poet
 Natili Tabari (10th century), physician
 Naubakht (9th century), designer of the city of Baghdad
 Naubakht, Fadhl ibn (8th century), astronomer
 Nawbakhty (4th Hijri century), Islamic scholar, philosopher
 Nizam al-Din Nishapuri, mathematician, astronomer, jurist, exegete, and poet
 Nawbakhti, Ruh (10th century), Islamic scholar
 Nayrizi (865–922), mathematician and astronomer
 Naqshband, Baha ud-Din (1318–1389), philosopher
 Abu al-Qasim al-Habib Neishapuri (18th century), physician
 Muslim ibn al-Hajjaj (c. 815–875), Islamic scholar
 Nurbakhshi (16th century), physician
 Abu Hafs Umar an-Nasafi, theologian, mufassir, muhaddith and historian
 Al-Nasa'i, hadith collector
 Shihab al-Din Muhammad al-Nasawi, historian and biographer
 Abu Nu`aym, Islamic scholar

O 

 Ostanes, ancient Persian alchemist

P
 Paul the Persian (6th century), philosopher

Q
 Qazwini, Zakariya (1203–1283), physician
 Qumi, Qazi Sa’id (1633–1692), theologian
 Qumri (10th century), physician
 Ali Qushji (1403–16 December 1474), mathematician, astronomer and physician
 Ali al-Qari, Islamic scholar
 Ali Ibn Ibrahim Qomi, jurist and Shia scholar
 Al-Quda'i (d. 1062), judge, preacher and historian in Fatimid Egypt

R
 Razi, Amin (16th century), geographer
 Razi Amoli, Fakhreddin (1149–1209), philosopher
 Razi, Zakariya (Rhazes) (c. 865–925), chemist, physician, and philosopher
 Razi, Najmeddin (1177–1256), mystic
 Rumi, Jalal ad-Din Muhammad (1207–1273), Muslim poet, jurist, Islamic scholar, theologian, and Sufi mystic
 Rashid-al-Din Hamadani (1247–1318), historian, physician and politician
 Abu Hatim Ahmad ibn Hamdan al-Razi, Ismaili philosopher
 Rudaki (858–941), Persian poet

S
 Sabzevari, Mulla Hadi (1797–1873), poet and philosopher
 Saghani Ostorlabi (?–990), astronomer
 Sahl, Fadl ibn (?–818), astronomer
 Sahl, Shapur ibn (?–869), physician
 Samarqandi, Najibeddin (13th century), physician
 Samarqandi, Ashraf (c. 1250–c. 1310), mathematician, astronomer
 Sarakhsi, Muhammad ibn Ahmad (?–1096), Islamic scholar
 Ahmad ibn al-Tayyib al-Sarakhsi, historian, traveller
 Shahrastani (1086–1153), historian of religions
 Shahrazuri (13th century), philosopher and physician
 Shahrazuri, Ibn al-Salah (1181–1245), Islamic scholar
 Shaykh Tusi (996–1067), Islamic scholar
 Ibn Babawayh (923–991), theologian
 Ibn Sahl, mathematician, physicist
 Abu ul-Ala Shirazi (d. 1001 CE), physician
 Shaykh Muhammad ibn Thaleb, physician
 Shirazi, Imad al-Din Mas'ud (16th century), physician
 Shirazi, Muhammad Hadi Khorasani (18th century), physician
 Shirazi, Qutbeddin (1236–1311), astronomer
 Shirazi, Mahmud ibn Ilyas (18th century), physician
 Shirazi, Najm al-Din Mahmud ibn Ilyas (?–1330), physician
 Shirazi, Qurayshi (17th century), physician
 Shirazi, Sultan Waezin (1894–1971), theologian
 Sibawayh, linguist and grammarian
 Sijzi (c. 945–c. 1020), mathematician and astronomer 
 Sijzi, Mas'ud (14th century), physician
 Abd al-Rahman al-Sufi (903–986), astronomer from Ray who invented the meridian ring
 Mūsā ibn Shākir, astronomer
 Suhrawardi, Shahab al-Din (1155–1191), philosopher
 Abu Sulayman Sijistani, philosopher
 ‘Abd ar-Razzaq as-San‘ani, Islamic scholar
 Zayn al-Din Omar Savaji, philosopher and logician
 Zeynalabdin Shirvani, geographer, philosopher and poet
 Abu Yaqub al-Sijistani, Ismaili philosopher
 Abu'l-'Anbas Saymari, astrologer

T
 Tabarani, Abu al-Qasim (873–970), Islamic scholar
 Tabari Amoli (839–923), historian
 Tabari, ibn Farrukhan (?–815), astrologer and architect
 Tabari, Abul Hasan (10th century), physician
 Tabari, Ibn Sahl (c. 783–c. 858), Jewish convert physician, master of Rhazes
 Tabrizi, Maqsud Ali (17th century), physician
 Taftazani (1322–1390), theologian, linguist
 Tayfur, Ibn Abi Tahir (819–893), linguist
 Tirmidhi (824–892), Islamic scholar
 Tunakabuni (17th century), physician
 Tughra'i (c. 1061–1122), physician
 Tusi, Nizam ol-Molk (1018–1092), Persian scholar and vizier of the Seljuq Empire
 Tusi, Nasireddin (1201–1274), Persian polymath, architect, philosopher, physician, scientist, and theologian
 Tusi, Sharafeddin (?–1213/4), mathematician
 Ahmad ibn Muhammad al-Tha'labi, Islamic scholar
 'Abd al-Hamīd ibn Turk, Persian or Turkish mathematician

U
 Safi al-Din al-Urmawi (c. 1216–1294), musician
 Abu al‐Uqul al‐Tabari (14th century), Yemenite astronomer of Iranian origin

V
 Amin al-Din Rashid al-Din Vatvat (13th century), scholar and physician

W
 Waqidi (748–822), historian
 Wassaf, historian
 Al-Wabkanawi, astronomer

Y
 Yaʿqūb ibn Ṭāriq (?–796), mathematician and astronomer
 Yunus ibn Habib, linguist
 Yahya ibn Ma'in, Islamic scholar
 Yunus al-Katib al-Mughanni, musician
 Yahya ibn Abi Mansur (d. 830 CE), astronomer

Z
 Zamakhshari (1074/5–1143/4), scholar and geographer
 Muhammad Zarrindast (11th century), oculist
 Zayn-e-Attar (?–c. 1403), physician
 Zarir Jurjani (9th century), mathematician and astronomer
 Zakariya al-Qazwini (1203–1283) physician, astronomer, geographer, and proto-science fiction writer

See also
 List of contemporary Iranian scientists, scholars, and engineers
List of Iranian mathematicians
 Nezamiyeh
 Academy of Gondishapur
 International rankings of Iran in science and technology
 List of Christian scientists and scholars of the medieval Islamic world
 List of pre-modern Arab scientists and scholars
 List of Turkic scholars

Notes

Scientists of the medieval Islamic world
Iranian
Iranian scientists
Scientists